91 Days is a Japanese anime television series. Set during the United States Prohibition era, the series follows Angelo Lagusa and his quest to seek revenge against the Vanetti Family. The series aired from July 9, 2016 to October 1, 2016.

Synopsis
The story is set in the fictional form of the United States during the last years of Prohibition in 1932, where brewed liquor dominates the black market thanks to the Italian Mafia. Angelo Lagusa, a young man whose family was murdered in a Mafia dispute, seeks revenge against the Vanetti Family, particularly its Don, Vincent Vanetti which is the Mafiosi that controls Lawless district, and one of the high ranking members of the Cosa Nostra. After seven years in hiding in the Midwest following the night of the murder, Angelo receives an anonymous letter from a friend of his father's, prompting him to return to Lawless and exact his revenge. Under the name of Avilio Bruno, he begins to infiltrate the Vanetti clan by slowly befriending the Don's son, Nero. However, in this dramatic 91-day story, revenge breeds revenge, and killing may yield drastic consequences. How will Angelo Lagusa and Nero Vanetti fare, in this tragic harvest field that they have only begun to sow?

Characters

Main characters

A victim of a traditional Sicilian crime. Seven years before the arrival of the letter, his family was mercilessly slaughtered by the Vanettis. He has a severe hatred for the murderers of his family and hid for seven years until he received an anonymous letter to return to Lawless and exact his revenge on the ones responsible. He is known for his brilliant wiles. He tries to earn Nero Vanetti's trust to get to his father, so he can finish his revenge by killing them both with ease. He relies on the conspiracies of other clans to destroy the Vanettis.

The eldest son of Vanetti Family, and one of Angelo's main targets for revenge. He has a bright and positive personality, he values his Family above everything, and he never forgives traitors no matter what. With his father's illness, he knew the Galassias got the opportunity to force their way in and perish his father's rule, so he's willing to keep it from happening and let the Vanettis be the reigning Family of Lawless. He believes in the Family's pride, refusing to back down to the Orcos or the Galassias no matter what, if they demand something that will demean his Family. He later takes the Don seat of the Vanetti from his father Vincent, because he proved that he is smart as his father, and ruthless as a crime boss.

Vanetti Family
The Vanetti Family origins from Savoca, Sicily. When Vincenzo Vanetti immigrated to USA, due to the economic crisis, he dreamed of building an Empire that he can rule. He got Made in the Moreno Family through Ganzo Alari. He served under the Morenos for years, which had Lawless district and West Chicago on their palms, but the Morenos and the Galassias didn’t get along with each other, and Vincent took the opportunity to increase his own power by dealing with the Galassias in secrecy with Alari's help, but Don Moreno’s accountant, Testa Lagusa found out about this. In April 1925, Vincent killed Don Moreno and the Lagusas to keep the knowledge from being leaked out. For the last several years, the Vanettis were the most feared and respected Family alongside the Galassias, but with Vincent getting sick, the other clans began to rise, and that made the Vanetti authority begin to fail.

The Godfather of the Vanetti Family, known as Vincent Vanetti. Vincent is a religious and traditionalist man that values his Family above everything else. He is very smart and careful, he is known as "The Man That Rules Lawless From The Shadows". He loves opera and he has a dream to build a fancy playhouse for it. He is a ruthless man though trying to avoid a Mafia war, but when it comes to get what he wants, he is unstoppable. For the last decade he was the most feared and respected face of Lawless, but his illness made his power severely decrease both in Lawless and La Cosa Nostra.

Wife of Vincent Vanetti and mother of Nero, Fio, and Frate known as Connie. She died of an unknown illness when Nero was 10 years old. With Vincent seeing his children losing their mother, he promised himself to build them a good life (this was one of the reasons that made Vincent betray his Don and usurp his power).

Former underboss of the Moreno Family, and current left-hand man of Vincent. Not only is the person who sent Angelo the anonymous letter to come to Lawless, but he was also the fourth man on the night of the murder of Angelo’s family. Despite being prone to anger, he is a very greedy man and wants the higher-ups of his organization to be taken care of by Angelo, so he can have all the power, money, and women of Lawless to himself.

Nero's younger brother, and youngest son of Vincent Vanetti. He is willing to sacrifice anything to preserve peace between the Mafia clans. He is somewhat weak-willed, as he is even willing to kill his own brother to preserve the peace. He believes that the Vanetti's strength cannot stand against the Galassias and that they should surrender to them without a fight. He is jealous of Nero's natural ability to lead people and do as he pleases, and even believes that Nero is the sole cause of the chaos that caused both Galassias and Orcos to want him dead. Ronaldo started to vet him to be named the head of the Vanettis after the Galassias forced Vincent to step down, but fate didn’t let him to be the Don, no matter how much he wanted it.

Frate and Nero's sister and Vincent's only daughter. Her marriage with Ronaldo was pre-arranged to build alliance and kinship with the Galassia Family. She cares deeply for both her brothers and does not want either to die or fighting each other.

One of Nero Vanetti's closest friends, ever since childhood, and one of Angelo's main targets of revenge. Like Nero, he believes that the Vanettis own Lawless district and they should keep it to themselves, no matter what. He's a religious person, and has no qualms of starting a war with the rival clans.

The new Consigliere of the Vanetti Family. Nero's subordinate who is calm and collected. He helps Nero make smart decisions for the Family. He’s willing to sacrifice anything to protect Nero’s life.

The right-hand man and bodyguard of Vincent Vanetti. He has served under Vincent for many years since fighting in Europe. Vincent chose him to accompany killing the Lagusas but he gets caught on a crime for the Vanettis, after 5 years in prison he returns to the Vanettis and works as Vincent's personal bodyguard. He can’t speak cause his throat is wounded in the war. His physical and mental power makes it difficult to approach Vincent Vanetti.

A Vanetti Caporegime, and one of Nero's trusted subordinates and allies. He is one of the most loyal members of the Vanetti Family and refuses to back down, even if the price is death. When Frate Vanetti and Ronaldo tried to assassinate Nero, he saved him and wounded by Frate's men. Angelo makes a deal with Fango to save Tigre's life.

Professional Soldato of the Vanetti Family, and one of Nero's most loyal friends and reliable subordinates. When he and Angelo tried to assassinate Frate and Ronaldo, they failed and chased by the Vanettis. After getting away somewhere near the Vanettis' territory, Angelo kills him before warning Nero (Nero was not aware of the plan because it was made up by Angelo to incite the feud within the Vanetti clan and kill their men by each other). After Frate found his body, he thought that Nero set the assassination plan, so Frate and his men hanged his body on Lawless bridge as a message for Nero. And that caused the Vanetti Family an internal war between Frate and Nero, which made them lose many men, influence, and respect.

An ex-taxi driver and one of Nero's men, who was murdered by Orco's men, including Serpente when he and Vanno were smuggling booze in the Vanetti trade route. His death triggered the Vanetti clan's hatred of the Orco Family.

Nero's guard and spy. Nero uses him to watch over Angelo to be sure that he is not betraying him.

Orco Family
Don Orco used to be a member of the Moreno Family, but situations made him split from them. Since then, he became another Mafia Boss that made the streets of Lawless a bloody path. Not only they are rich but their name makes people afraid for their lives. Tactics, Anger, Prestige, and plans that are difficult to trace, can be found in this violent crime outfit.

The head of the Orco Family. An extremely gluttonous man who's very partial to lasagna. Orco is a fearless and conniving Don. He initially started the dispute between him and the Vanettis by stealing their trade route, but amplified the dispute by killing Tronco. Using Fango, Don Orco planned to kill Nero Vanetti in order to get truce between his organization and the Vanettis' faction, led by Frate, but then Fango became a liability. He meets his demise by Fango and gets eaten by his executives, as per his and Nero's deal to seek protection in exchange for overthrowing Orco.

A member of the Orco Family, and Caporegime of an independent group of assassins. He is ruthless, amibitious, and borderline psychotic person, who is willing to do whatever it takes to get what he wants. With help from Angelo and Nero, he overthrows Orco, subsequently kills him, feeds him to his executives, and becomes the boss of the organization by usurpation. He wants the recipe for Corteo's Lawless Heaven brew as he was seeking to hit it rich with the imminent end of Prohibition. He forms a bargain with Corteo, who is trying to escape the fighting; he would protect Corteo, as long as he gives him the recipe and the location of Nero, But when Scuza provides the recipe of Lawless Heaven, seized by the FBI in a raid on Vanetti's distillery, he no longer had a need for Corteo. He initially tries to kill Corteo, but then decides to leave him to the Vanettis, whom he had betrayed. But before he could inform them, Corteo kills him.

Fango's subordinate, and the Soldato that killed Tronco. Vanno would go on to kill him, avenging Tronco's death. His corpse was secretly taken by Cerotto and sold to Scuza, sparking a war between the Vanettis and Orcos.

An Orco Caporegime. He’s extremely smart, powerful, and one of the most trusted men of Don Orco. He cares deeply for loyalty and respect in the Mafia, unlike His Boss he’s extremely careful and calm. Fighting with him is not an easy job.

One of Orco's least important men. The Families use him to torture enemies and traitors.

One of Fango's non-Italian subordinates , who first served under Don Orco, then to Fango himself, then to Nero Vanetti. (After Fango's death, almost all of his men started working for the Vanettis)

One of Fango's thugs and Cerotto's older brother. The Orcos used him to extort Corteo, but Angelo took him down.

Botti's brother and Corteo's close friend, who got mixed up in the feud by trying to sell good alcohol. He witnessed Vanno killing Serpente, such that he sold his body to Scuza, for Fango. Since then, he became a butler for Fango.

Galassia Family
The Galassia family is part of the Chicago Outfit and controls the majority of Chicago's underworld and tries to grab hold of Lawless. Their feud with the Moreno Family led to the conspiracy that murdered Don Moreno and the Lagusas and created the Vanetti Empire that ruled Lawless for 7 years. They try their best to turn the Vanettis into their puppets. The Vanetti and Orco families are not strong enough to go against them and often comply with what they ask.

The head of the Galassia family based in Chicago. A carefree and somewhat cheerful man, Galassia set all plans in motion behind the scenes through his nephews Ronaldo and Strega. Following Ronaldo's death, he and his family grieve over him, but later, receive a free shipment of Lawless Heaven liquor as a sign that the Vanettis don’t want to be his enemies and instead want to make peace and possibly alliance with him, for which, he was invited to the Vanetti's opera theater's opening night.

Galassia's favourite nephew and Underboss and Ronaldo's cousin. He is secretly working with Ganzo to take out both Vincent and Nero. After his uncle dies, he kills Ganzo in retaliation, immediately becomes the Don and ends the Vanetti's reign over Lawless.

A nephew of Galassia and Strega's cousin. He married Fio in the pre-arranged marriage, made by his father-in-law Vincent in order to make alliance with Galassias. He believes in the authority that he has as a member of the Galassia family, using it to try and keep the other clans in Lawless under his control. He depends on Frate's fear and willingness to get acknowledged to control the Vanettis.

Lagusa Household
Testa Lagusa was a member of the Moreno Family, even before Vincent and the others. He was extremely loyal to his Don, which by the time they controlled all brothels, bars and black market of Lawless. But with Vincent's betrayal and Galassia's rising influence, Testa and Moreno were murdered by the Vanettis. But his only legacy for revenge, Angelo, makes the story longer for bloodshed.

Angelo's father who was killed by the Vanettis. He was Moreno's accountant, He knew about the deals going on between the Vanetti and Galassia families, and his family was murdered to keep the knowledge from being leaked out.

Angelo's mother and Testa's wife, who was killed by the Vanetti clan.

Angelo's younger brother who was killed by the Vanettis, because Vincent believed that if he grows up, he will avenge his father and won't forget about them.

Supporting characters

The Don of the Moreno Family known as "The Godfather of Lawless" who controlled West Chicago and Lawless district, but didn’t get along with the Galassias and lost many turfs to them. When the Morenos and the Galassias were at war, Vincent took the opportunity to take over his Don's Empire by making deals with the Galassias in secrecy. In 1925, the Vanettis killed Don Moreno and took over all of his assets. Even after his death, the streets of Lawless couldn’t forget the crime lord that lost all of his heirs for the Vanettis. (He doesn’t physically appear within the series because of his mightiness in the story)

a corrupt police officer in the town of Khota. When Nero greased his hand with some money, he asked him if he knows a bar, so Nick told him a secret place. However, when Mad Mack tortured him to tell him where Nero and Angelo are, he killed him right after he got the answer.

Angelo's close childhood friend. His father was one of Moreno's men that murdered in a dispute, since then, he and his mother lived in poverty, but they were helped out by the Lagusa family. He has developed an extremely delicious brew of alcohol called Lawless Heaven, which he starts to make for the Vanetti Family. The only problem is that the ingredients and mixture are more complex than other brews. He is brought into the plot by Angelo. though he hates the Mob, but his love to Angelo made him a part of it. He later becomes very scared about the entire situation and hopes to try and find a way out.

The corrupt Head of the Federal Bureau of Prohibition in Lawless. Through Delphy's investigation of the Lodge, he manages to dig up the recipe for Lawless Heaven, after he was reinstated back to his position, tries to sell it to Fango for an overinflated price, but gets killed instead.

A member of the Federal Bureau of Prohibition from Chicago who replaces Scuza. He has bold intentions to clean up the corruption and organized crime in Lawless. He had been investigating bars all over town, seeking to put liquor sales to a halt, thus limiting the income of the Vanetti Family. He subsequently drops his investigation after the Vanettis threatened to kill his wife and daughter through a car bomb.

A Mexican hitman hired by an unknown group of people (those who hired him could be either Orco or Frate's henchmen) to take out Nero and Angelo. Though he’s extreme powerful, he fails the assassination and gets killed by a farmer.

The caretaker that looked after Connie Vanetti when she was ill.

Fango's mistress, who runs her own shop. She was with him at her apartment, when Angelo attempted to assassinate Fango.

Angelo's friend in orphanage who eventually appears in a bar. He gets killed by Angelo.

The newest recruit of the Vanetti Family.

A temporary friend of Angelo that he met in Chicago.

Amy's boyfriend.

Story Locations

Lawless
Vanetti's Mansion: Vincent's Mansion, originally the headquarters of the Moreno Family headed by Don Moreno which was usurped by Vincent after the Vanetti's took over.

The Island: A sandbar, a church turned into a speakeasy after the prohibition, Fango takes over it as his HQ after he splits from the Orco Family, the location plays a huge role in the Vanetti internal war, after Fango dies the Vanettis take over it until the Vanetti-Galassia war which ends the entire Vanetti's reign over Lawless and Illinois.

The Lodge: Lawless Heaven's HQ belonging to the Vanetti's Family specifically Nero's faction.

Ottimo Orco: Don Orco's restaurant and fact base of his group's operations, after Fango takes over he renames it as Ottimo Fango.

Vanetti Route: The smuggling route controlled by the Vanetti Family, it causes a lot of dispute after Nero's faction steal Orco's booze, it gets dominated for a while by the Orco Family.

The Playhouse: An Opera theatre belonging to the Vanetti Family, modelled after Milan La Scala, which is built by an Italian architect funded by Vincent. It opens at July where the Don Galassia is invited.

Lawless Port: mainly controlled by the Vanetti Family for illegal operations.

Chicago
The majority of Chicago is controlled by the Galassias, it’s where Angelo meets with Don Galassia and his nephew Strega.

Khota
A town located around Illinois, Nero and Angelo run to after the incident of Serpente's death.

Production and release
The anime was announced in March 2016. It is directed by Hiro Kaburagi and written by Taku Kishimoto, with animation by the studio Shuka. Tomohiro Kishi is designing the series' characters, and Shōgo Kaida is producing the music. The opening theme song, "Signal", is performed by TK from Ling tosite sigure, while the closing theme, "Rain or Shine", is performed by ELISA. The series premiered on July 9, 2016 on TBS and also aired on the Animeism programming block on MBS, CBC and BS-TBS. The series was simulcasted on Crunchyroll, with Funimation handling dubbing and distribution of the series in North America.

Notes

References

External links
   
 

Organized crime in anime and manga
Anime with original screenplays
Animeism
Crime in anime and manga
Crime drama television series
Crunchyroll anime
Drama anime and manga
Anime and manga about revenge